Bardu is a municipality in Troms og Finnmark county, Norway. The administrative centre of the municipality is the village of Setermoen, the largest urban area in the municipality.

The  municipality is the 18th largest by area out of the 356 municipalities in Norway. Bardu is the 202nd most populous municipality in Norway with a population of 3,993.

Norway's largest military garrison is located at Setermoen. The military is the municipality's largest employer and more than 1,000 young soldiers perform their duty service here each year. The world's most northern zoo, Polar Park, is located in the southern part of the municipality.

General information

The municipality of Bardodalen was established in 1854 when the eastern part of the old Ibestad Municipality was separated to form the new municipality. The initial population of the new municipality was 757. The municipal borders have not changed since then, although the name was later changed to Bardu.

On 1 January 2020, the municipality became part of the newly formed Troms og Finnmark county. Previously, it had been part of the old Troms county.

Name
The municipality has had several name variations since its establishment in 1854. Initially, the name was Bardodalen from 1854 until 1889. Then the name was shortened to Bardo from 1889 until 1909. Finally, in 1909, the spelling was changed to Bardu. The root of the name is possibly a Norwegianized form of the Sámi name . The meaning of the Sámi name is probably "long and steep mountain side". The original suffix of the name,  means "the valley", thus the name was "the valley of Bardo". An alternate explanation is that "Bardo" is a corruption of the old Norwegian male name Berto or Berdo.

Coat of arms
The coat of arms was granted on 6 June 1980. The official blazon is "Or, a wolverine statant sable". This means the arms have a charge that is a wolverine which has a tincture of sable. The field (background) has a tincture of Or which means it is commonly colored yellow, but if it is made out of metal, then gold is used. The wolverine was chosen as a symbol for the large forests and the rich wildlife in the municipality. There is a permanent population of wolverines living in the extensive forests  and mountain areas of Bardu. The motif also expresses strength and continuity. The arms were designed by Arvid Sveen.

Churches
The Church of Norway has one parish within the municipality of Bardu. It is part of the Indre Troms prosti (deanery) in the Diocese of Nord-Hålogaland.

Government
All municipalities in Norway, including Bardu, are responsible for primary education (through 10th grade), outpatient health services, senior citizen services, unemployment and other social services, zoning, economic development, and municipal roads. The municipality is governed by a municipal council of elected representatives, which in turn elect a mayor.  The municipality falls under the Senja District Court and the Hålogaland Court of Appeal.

Municipal council
The municipal council  of Bardu is made up of 19 representatives that are elected to four year terms. The party breakdown of the council is as follows:

Mayors
The mayors of Bardu (incomplete list):

1955–1961: Alfred Henningsen(Ap)
1975–1979: Alfred Henningsen (Ap)
1980–1988: Reidar Kroken (Sp)
1988–1991: Bjørn Espenes (H)
1991–1995: Bjarne Kollstrøm (H)
1995–1999: Ragnhild Movinkel (Sp)
1999–2003: Roald Linaker (Ap)
2003–2011: Oddvar Bjørnsen (Sp)
2011–2015: Arne Nysted (Ap)
2015–present: Toralf Heimdal (Sp)

Geography
Bardu borders the municipalities of Lavangen and Salangen to the west, Målselv to the north, Narvik (in Nordland county) to the south, and Sweden to the east. The Barduelva river runs through the municipality from south to north along the Bardudalen valley. The Salangsdalen valley is located along the western part of the municipality. The largest lake in the county, Altevatnet, is located in the eastern part of the municipality, near the smaller lakes Geavdnjajávri and Leinavatn. These lakes lie in and near Rohkunborri National Park.

Climate
Bardu, although not far from the coast, is known for its cold winters compared to the coastal areas. This is caused by mountains usually blocking the milder, coastal air from reaching the Bardu valley. In summer, however, it is usually warmer than the coastal areas.

Notable people

 Alfred Henningsen (1918–2012) a military officer, spy and politician; Mayor of Bardu for over nine years, lived in Setermoen
 Sissel Solbjørg Bjugn (1947 in Bardu – 2011) a Norwegian poet and children's writer
 Regina Alexandrova (born 1967) a Norwegian politician, Bardu municipal councillor from 2007 to 2015

Sport 
 Ole Hegge (1898 in Bardu – 1994) a cross-country skier and ski jumper, silver medallist at the 1928 Winter Olympics
 Fred Børre Lundberg (born  1969) a Nordic combined performer, won two team silver medals and one team gold medal at the 1992, 1994 and 1998 Winter Olympics and an individual gold at the 1994 Winter Olympics, raised in Bardufoss
 Kristian Hammer (born 1976) a Norwegian Nordic combined skier, grew up in Setermoen

Media gallery

References

External links

Municipal fact sheet from Statistics Norway

http://www.polarzoo.no

 
Municipalities of Troms og Finnmark
Populated places of Arctic Norway
1854 establishments in Norway